The name Ondoy was assigned by the Philippine Atmospheric, Geophysical and Astronomical Services Administration (PAGASA) to three tropical cyclones in the Western Pacific Ocean. The name was retired from future use in the Philippine Area of Responsibility following the 2009 Pacific typhoon season, and replaced with "Odette" beginning in 2013.

 Tropical Storm Ondoy (2001) (28W) – a weak storm that completed a loop to the east of Samar Island before moving further out to sea.
 Tropical Storm Tembin (2005) (T0522, 23W, Ondoy) – made landfall in the northern Philippines.
 Typhoon Ketsana (2009) (T0916, 17W, Ondoy) – made landfall in the Philippines and causing massive flooding in Metro Manila and other nearby provinces.

Pacific typhoon set index articles